Sularz is a Polish surname. Notable people with the surname include:

Guy Sularz (born 1955), American baseball player
Jerry Sularz (1937–2007), Polish soccer goalkeeper 

Polish-language surnames